725 Amanda (prov. designation:  or ) is a dark background asteroid, approximately  in diameter, that is located in the central regions of the asteroid belt. It was discovered by Austrian astronomer Johann Palisa at the Vienna Observatory on 21 October 1911. The carbonaceous C-type asteroid (CSU/C0) has a short rotation period of 3.7 hours. It was named after Amanda Schorr, wife of German astronomer Richard Schorr (1867–1951).

Orbit and classification 

Amanda is a non-family asteroid of the main belt's background population when applying the hierarchical clustering method to its proper orbital elements. It orbits the Sun in the central asteroid belt at a distance of 2.0–3.1 AU once every 4 years and 2 months (1,507 days; semi-major axis of 2.57 AU). Its orbit has an eccentricity of 0.22 and an inclination of 4° with respect to the ecliptic. The body's observation arc begins at Vienna Observatory on 29 September 1915, almost four years after its official discovery observation.

Naming 

This minor planet was named after Amanda Schorr, wife of Richard Schorr (1867–1951), a German astronomer at Bergedorf Observatory, after whom asteroid 1235 Schorria and lunar crater Schorr were named. The asteroid's name was proposed by Palisa in 1913, on the occasion of the 24th meeting of the Astronomische Gesellschaft in Hamburg, Germany. The  was also mentioned in The Names of the Minor Planets by Paul Herget in 1955.

Physical characteristics 

In the Tholen classification, Amandas spectral type is closest to that of a carbonaceous C-type asteroid, yet also somewhat similar to a stony S-type with an "unusual" spectrum (CSU). In the taxonomy by Barucci (1987), the asteroid is a dark C-type (C0).

Rotation period and poles 

A rotational lightcurve of Amanda was obtained from photometric observations by European astronomers at the La Silla Observatory before 1995. Lightcurve analysis gave a well-defined rotation period of  hours with a brightness variation of  magnitude.

In October 2010, French amateur astronomer Maurice Audejean  determined a concurring period of  hours with an amplitude of  magnitude, while in August 2018, a further observation by the TESS-team reported a period of  hours and an amplitude of  magnitude.

In 2016, a modeled lightcurve gave a sidereal period of  hours using data from the Uppsala Asteroid Photometric Catalogue, the Palomar Transient Factory survey, and individual observers, as well as sparse-in-time photometry from the NOFS, the Catalina Sky Survey, and the La Palma surveys . The study also determined two spin axes of (145.0°, −63.0°) and (320.0°, −70.0°) in ecliptic coordinates (λ, β).

Diameter and albedo 

The Collaborative Asteroid Lightcurve Link derives an albedo of 0.0824 and calculates a diameter of 21.56 kilometers based on an absolute magnitude of 11.66.

References

External links 
 Lightcurve Database Query (LCDB), at www.minorplanet.info
 Dictionary of Minor Planet Names, Google books
 Asteroids and comets rotation curves, CdR – Geneva Observatory, Raoul Behrend
 Discovery Circumstances: Numbered Minor Planets (1)-(5000) – Minor Planet Center
 
 

000725
Discoveries by Johann Palisa
Amanda
000725
19111021